The Zhexi Dam is a buttress dam on the Zi Shui River near Zhexi in Anhua County of Hunan Province, China. The primary purpose of the dam is hydroelectric power generation and it supports a 947.5 MW power station. Construction began on the dam in June 1958 and the first generator was operational on 28 January 1962. The last of the five original generators was commissioned in 1975. In 1977 a 30-ton ship lift was completed on the left bank of the dam. The power station was expanded by 2010 to increase the installed capacity by 500 MW, from 447.5 MW to 947.5 MW.

See also

List of dams and reservoirs in China
List of tallest dams in China

References

Dams in China
Buttress dams
Dams completed in 1962
Energy infrastructure completed in 1975
Hydroelectric power stations in Hunan